David Carty (born 1941 ) is an Irish former Gaelic footballer who played for club side Skryne and at inter-county level with the Meath senior football team. He usually lined out as a forward.

Honours

Skryne
Meath Senior Football Championship: 1965 (c)

Meath
All-Ireland Senior Football Championship: 1967
Leinster Senior Football Championship: 1964, 1966 (c), 1967

References

1941 births
Living people
Skryne Gaelic footballers
Meath inter-county Gaelic footballers
Winners of one All-Ireland medal (Gaelic football)